In mathematics, the Aubin–Lions lemma (or theorem) is the result in the theory of Sobolev spaces of Banach space-valued functions, which provides a compactness criterion that is useful in the study of nonlinear evolutionary partial differential equations. Typically, to prove the existence of solutions one first constructs approximate solutions (for example, by a Galerkin method or by mollification of the equation), then uses the compactness lemma to show that there is a convergent subsequence of approximate solutions whose limit is a solution.

The result is named after the French mathematicians Jean-Pierre Aubin and Jacques-Louis Lions. In the original proof by Aubin, the spaces X0 and X1 in the statement of the lemma were assumed to be reflexive, but this assumption was removed by Simon, so the result is also referred to as the Aubin–Lions–Simon  lemma.

Statement of the lemma

Let X0, X and X1 be three Banach spaces with X0 ⊆ X ⊆ X1.  Suppose that X0 is compactly embedded in X and that X is continuously embedded in X1.  For , let

(i) If  then the embedding of  into  is compact.

(ii) If  and  then the embedding of  into  is compact.

See also 
 Lions–Magenes lemma

Notes

References
 
 
  (Theorem  II.5.16)
 
  (Sect.7.3)
  (Proposition III.1.3)
 
 

Banach spaces
Theorems in functional analysis
Lemmas in analysis
Measure theory